Reba Maybury (born 1990), also known as Mistress Rebecca, is a British-Pakistani artist.

Early life and education 
Maybury was born in Oxford in 1990 to a Pakistani mother and a Welsh father and has a younger sister.

Exhibitions

Solo/duo exhibitions
From Paris With Love, Treize, Paris, 2022
Faster than an erection, Museum of Contemporary Art (MACRO), Rome, 2021 
Moralists at a Costume Party, Huset for Kunst og Design, Holstebro, Denmark, 2021
A-good-individual, schwarzescafé LUMA Westbau, Zurich, 2019
My Deep Secret (with Will Sheldon), Arcadia Missa, London, 2018
Fish Wives (with Claire Barrow), Paramount Ranch (with Shoot The Lobster), United States, 2016

Group exhibitions
SexKino Roland, NEXPO, Zurich, 2022
In the Company of, Eden Eden Isabella Bortolozzi, Berlin, 2022
The Puppet Show, Centre d’art Contemporain, Geneva, 2022
Isabella, Associazione Barriera, Turin, 2022
The Baroness, Mimosa House, London, 2022
sub/dominium curated by SoiL Thornton, Chateau Shatto, Los Angeles, 2021
Put A Sock In It!, Sophie Tappinier, Vienna, 2021
Exhibition For Your Apartment, Dawid Radziszewski Gallery, Warsaw, 2021
In Excess, 3hD, Power Play, Berlin, 2021
Witchhunt, Kunsthal Charlottenborg, Copenhagen, 2020
The Monstrous Bouquet, Omstand, Arnhem, 2020
Do You Love Me?, P.P.O.W , New York, 2019
Paint, Also Known as Blood, Museum of Modern Art, Warsaw, 2019
I, I, I, I, I, I, I, Kathy Acker, ICA, London, 2019
Putting Out, Gavin Brown’s Enterprise, New York, 2018
Prick Up Your Ears!, Karma International, Los Angeles, 2018

Bibliography
Faster than an erection, with a poem by Cassandra Troyan. Wet Satin Press and MACRO, 2021.
BINTS! A Conversation Between Mistress Rebecca and the Elysium Harvester, Wet Satin Press, 2019
Dining with Humpty Dumpty, Wet Satin Press, 2017 and Arcadia Missa, 2019
The Goddess and the Worm, Wet Satin Press, 2015

References

1990 births
Living people
Alumni of Central Saint Martins
Academics of Central Saint Martins
British people of Pakistani descent
English feminists
English dominatrices
English feminist writers
Feminist artists
British socialist feminists